Scott McKinley (born October 15, 1968) is an American former cyclist. He competed in the road race at the 1988 Summer Olympics.

Major results
Sources:

1986
 1st Stage 1 (TTT) Dusika Jugend Tour
 8th World Junior Road race
1989
 1st Houchtalen-Helchteren
 7th Reading Classic
1990
 1st Stage 1 Étoile de Bessèges
 1st Stage 1 Westfalen Rundfahrt
1992
 9th Lancaster Classic
 10th Reading Classic
1993
 National Championships
2nd Criterium
2nd Road race
 2nd Norwest Cycling Cup
 6th Philly Cycling Classic
 9th First Union Grand Prix
 10th Lancaster Classic
1994
 10th First Union Grand Prix

References

External links

1968 births
Living people
American male cyclists
Olympic cyclists of the United States
Cyclists at the 1988 Summer Olympics
Sportspeople from Seattle